The 1884 United States presidential election in Pennsylvania took place on November 4, 1884, as part of the 1884 United States presidential election. Voters chose 30 representatives, or electors to the Electoral College, who voted for president and vice president.

Pennsylvania voted for the Republican nominee, James G. Blaine, over the Democratic nominee, Grover Cleveland. Blaine won Pennsylvania by a margin of 9.51%. This was the first time since 1824 that the national winner of the election did not carry Pennsylvania, and the first time since 1800 that Pennsylvania voted for a candidate who lost both the electoral and national popular vote (In 1824, it cast its vote for Andrew Jackson, who won the popular vote but lost in the contingent house election).

Results

Results by county

See also
 List of United States presidential elections in Pennsylvania

References

Pennsylvania
1884
1884 Pennsylvania elections